The Land Component is the land branch of the Belgian Armed Forces. The King of the Belgians is the commander in chief. The current chief of staff of the Land Component is Major-General Pierre Gérard.

Ranks in use by the Belgian Army are listed at Belgian military ranks.

History

Organisation 1870s 

According to the Law of 16 August 1873, the army was to consist of:

Infantry 
14 regiments of line infantry (three active battalions, one reserve and one company in each regiment depot)
3 regiments of Jäger (three active battalions, one reserve and one company in each regiment depot)
1 regiment of grenadiers (three active battalions, one reserve and one company in each regiment depot)
1 regiment of Carabinier (four active battalions, 2 reserve and 1 depot company of deposit)
2 companies settled
1 discipline body 
1 military school for children of servicemen

Note: a battalion (864 men) consists of four companies of 216 men

Cavalry 
4 regiments of lancers (4 active squadrons and one reinforcement in each regiment)
4 regiments of guides (4 active squadrons and one reinforcement in each regiment)
2 regiments of Chasseur (4 active squadrons and one reinforcement in each regiment)

Note: a squadron had approximately 130 horses

Artillery 
4 regiments of artillery (10 batteries in each regiment)
3 regiments of fortress artillery or siege artillery (16 batteries, 1 battery and 1 spare battery depot in each regiment)
1 pontoon company 
1 company of artificers
1 company of gunsmiths
1 company of artillery workers

Note: A battery has 6 guns

Engineering 
1 Engineer Regiment (3 active battalions and one depot battalion)
1 railway company
1 campaign Telegraph company
1 telegraph room company
1 pontoon room company 
1 workers company

Train 
7 train companies

World War I 

A major reorganisation of the army had been authorised by the government in 1912, providing for a total army of 350,000 men by 1926 - 150,000 in the field forces, 130,000 in fortress garrisons and 70,000 reserves and auxiliaries. At the outbreak of war this reorganisation was nowhere near complete and only 117,000 men could be mobilised for the field forces, with the other branches equally deficient.

The Commander-in-Chief was King Albert I, with Lieutenant-General Chevalier Antonin de Selliers de Moranville as the Chief of the General Staff from 25 May 1914 until 6 September 1914 when a Royal Decree abolished the function of Chief of Staff of the army. In this way the King secured his control of the command.

1st Division (Lieutenant-General Baix) - around Ghent.
2nd Division (Lieutenant-General Dassin) - Antwerp.
3rd Division (Lieutenant-General Leman) - around Liège.
4th Division (Lieutenant-General Michel) - Namur and Charleroi.
5th Division (Lieutenant-General Ruwet) - around Mons.
6th Division (Lieutenant-General Albert Lantonnois van Rode) - Brussels.
Cavalry Division (Lieutenant-General de Witte) - Brussels.

In addition, there were garrisons at Antwerp, Liège and Namur, each placed under the command of the local divisional commander.

Each division contained three mixed brigades (of two infantry regiments and one artillery regiment), one cavalry regiment, and one artillery regiment, as well as various support units. Each infantry regiment contained three battalions, with one regiment in each brigade having a machine-gun company of six guns. An artillery regiment had three batteries of four guns.

The nominal strength of a division varied from 25,500 to 32,000 all ranks, with a total strength of eighteen infantry battalions, a cavalry regiment, eighteen machine-guns, and forty-eight guns. Two divisions (the 2nd and 6th) each had an additional artillery regiment, for a total of sixty guns.

The Cavalry Division had two brigades of two regiments each, three horse artillery batteries, and a cyclist battalion, along with support units; it had a total strength of 4,500 all ranks with 12 guns, and was - in effect - little more than a reinforced brigade.

World War II 

In 1940, the King of Belgium was the commander in chief of the Belgian Army which had 100,000 active-duty personnel; its strength could be raised to 550,000 when fully mobilized. The army was composed of seven infantry corps, that were garrisoned at Brussels, Antwerp, and Liège, and two divisions of partially-mechanized cavalry Corps at Brussels and the Ardenne. The Corps was as follows: 
 I Corps with the 1st, 4th, and 7th Infantry Divisions
 II Corps with the 6th, 11th, and 14th Infantry Divisions
 III Corps with the 1st Chasseurs Ardennais and the 2nd and 3rd Infantry Divisions
 IV Corps with the 9th, 15th, and 18th Infantry Divisions
 V Corps with three divisions
 VI Corps with three divisions 
Each Army Corps had its own headquarters staff, two active and several reserve Infantry Divisions, Corps Artillery Regiment of four battalions of two batteries with 16 artillery pieces per battalion, and a Pioneer regiment.

Each infantry division had a divisional staff along with three infantry regiments, each of 3,000 men. Each regiment had 108 light machine guns, 52 heavy machine guns, nine heavy mortars or infantry gun howitzers, plus six antitank guns.

Within the Free Belgian Forces that were formed in Great Britain during the occupation of Belgium between 1940–45, there was a land force formation, the 1st Belgian Infantry Brigade. An additional three divisions were raised and trained in Northern Ireland, but the war ended before they could see action. However, they joined the initial Belgian occupation force in Germany, I Belgian Corps, whose headquarters moved to Luedenscheid in October 1946. Of the 75,000 troops that found themselves in Germany on 8 May 1945, the vast majority had been recruited after the liberation of Belgium.

Cold War 

During the Cold War, Belgium provided the I Belgian Corps (HQ Haelen Kaserne, Junkersdorf, Lindenthal (Cologne)), consisting of the 1st Infantry Division in Liège and 16th Mechanised Division in Neheim-Hüsten, to NATO's Northern Army Group for the defence of West Germany. There were also two reserve brigades (10th Mechanised Brigade, Limbourg, and the 12th Motorised Brigade, Liège), slightly bigger than the four active brigades, which were intended as reinforcements for the two divisions. Interior forces comprised the Para-Commando Regiment in Heverlee, three national defence light infantry battalions (5th Chasseurs Ardennais, 3rd Carabiniers-cyclists, and 4th Carabiniers-cyclists), four engineer battalions, and nine provincial regiments with two to five light infantry battalions each. (Isby and Kamps, 1985, 64, 72)

After the end of the Cold War, forces were reduced. Initial planning in 1991 called for a Belgian-led corps with 2 or 4 Belgian brigades, a German brigade, and possibly a U.S. brigade. However, by 1992 this plan was looking unlikely and in 1993 a single Belgian division with two brigades became part of the Eurocorps.

Structure

The Land Component is organised as 1 Brigade and 1 Special Operations Regiment. In total, the Land Component consists of almost 10,000 active military personnel (as of 2019). After the 2018 reforms, the ground forces are organised as follows: 

COMOPSLAND (the HQ of the  Land Component) It oversees and plans all activities and operations of the land component. 

 Motorized Brigade at Leopoldsburg (formed from the  Medium Brigade). The brigade comprises about 7,500 soldiers divided into 16 units. The combat capacity consists of three motorized infantry battalions equipped with Piranha IIIC vehicles and two light infantry battalions equipped with Dingo 2 vehicles, which are supported by two engineer battalions, two logistic battalions, two CIS groups (communications), one field artillery battalion, one reconnaissance (ISTAR) battalion equipped with Pandur I vehicles, two military training camps and a headquarters company. In the future the brigade is to be reorganized into four infantry battalions and two cavalry battalions.

 Special Operations Regiment  (formerly the Light Brigade) at Marche-en-Famenne. The regiment has approximately 1,500 elite soldiers under its command. It plans and carries out special operations all around the world and is the main expeditionary unit of the Belgian ground forces. The regiment consists of the 2nd commando battalion, the 3rd parachute battalion, the special forces group (SFG)  the 6th communications group, parachute, and commando training centres, and the 4th commando HQ company. All units have airborne capabilities. The regiment operates light armoured vehicles to maneuver across difficult terrains.

The service capacity comprises following units: 

 Military Police Group
 Information operations group
 Explosive Removal and Destruction Service (known as DOVO in Dutch and SEDEE in French)
 Movement Control Group
 29th Logistic battalion 
 Field accommodation unit 
 The training centres and camps. The training capacity comprises four departments: the Training Department Infantry at Arlon, the Training Department Armour-Cavalry at Leopoldsburg, the Training Department Artillery at Brasschaat and the Training Department Engineers at Namur.

Some of the regiments in the Land Component, such as the Regiment 12th of the Line Prince Leopold - 13th of the Line, have names consisting of multiple elements. This is the result of a series of amalgamations that took place over the years. The Regiment 12th of the Line Prince Leopold - 13th of the Line was created in 1993 as a result of the merger of the 12th Regiment of the Line Prince Leopold and the 13th Regiment of the Line.

Ranks

Officer ranks
The rank insignia of commissioned officers.

Other ranks
The rank insignia of non-commissioned officers and enlisted personnel.

Equipment

The Belgian Army went through a major re-equipment programme for most of its vehicles. The aim was to phase out all tracked vehicles in favour of wheeled vehicles. As of 2010, the tank units were to be disbanded or amalgamated with the Armored Infantry (two infantry companies and one tank squadron per battalion). Forty Leopard 1 tanks were to be sold. As of 2013, only some M113 variants (Radar, recovery, command posts, and driving school vehicles) and Leopard variants (Recovery, AVLB, Pionier, driving tanks) will remain in service.

The Leopard 1A5 tank was retired on 10 September 2014. 56 of the tanks were sold, about 24 will stay as historic monuments or serve as a museum pieces; the rest will be phased out or used for target practice. In 2008 a sale of 43 Leopard 1A5(BE) to Lebanon was concluded, but as of 2018 was not finalized due to "the absence of licensing for export from Germany."

In the strategical defense vision report of the Belgian government, it was stated that by 2030 the Belgian land component will invest in new modern equipment such as weapons, vehicles, communication assets, body armor and more.

References

External links

Belgian Army website 
Belgian Army website 
The Special Forces Group of the belgian army (Dutch and French)